Metropolitan Opera Live in HD (also known as The Met: Live in HD) is a series of live opera performances transmitted in high-definition video via satellite from the Metropolitan Opera in New York City to select venues, primarily movie theaters, in the United States and other parts of the world. The first transmission was of a condensed English-language version of Mozart's The Magic Flute on December 30, 2006. Many of the video recordings are later rebroadcast via public television as part of the Great Performances at the Met series, and most are made available for streaming at Met Opera on Demand.

History
To transmit the series via satellite simulcast in the US and Canada, the Met has partnered with Fathom Events. The series is broadcast to AMC Theatres, Cinemark, Cineplex Entertainment, Regal Entertainment Group (Regal Cinemas, United Artists and Edwards), Goodrich, Kerasotes, Marcus and National Amusements movie theaters as well as a series of independent venues such as arts centers and college campuses. Its aims include building a larger audience for the Met and garnering excitement for arts at a local level.

The original idea for presenting operas in this way came from the new incoming general manager of the Met, Peter Gelb in late 2006. Exhibiting the Met's performances in digital movie theaters is in line with other audience-expanding efforts by the Met such as radio broadcasts on Sirius Radio, iPod downloads, live streaming video on the Met website, and free opening night screenings in Times Square and at Lincoln Center. The Met is also sponsoring free HD broadcasts into selected New York City public schools.

The simulcasts allow more people to experience the Met's performance offerings. This audience includes current opera fans unable to get to New York City to see the shows in person and potential opera fans looking for an easy, affordable method of checking out a new art form.

Tom Galley, chief operations and technology officer of National CineMedia, describes the experience by saying:

In the US, the series has also been broadcast in both high definition and regular TV as part of the Public Broadcasting Service's Great Performances series under the title Great Performances at the Met. In addition, selected performances can now be viewed online.

International expansion
The first season included seven theatres in Britain, two in Japan and one in Norway. After its successful launch, several other countries joined for the second season and 100 screens were added, selling an additional 20,000 tickets.  These included cinemas in Belgium, France, Germany, Italy, and Spain.

2008 saw the network expand even further to include more screens in the countries named above plus other countries such as Australia, Austria, the Czech Republic, Hungary, Latvia, Lithuania, Luxembourg, the Netherlands, New Zealand, Argentina (Buenos Aires and Mar del Plata), and Poland, as well as the territory of Puerto Rico.

Reaction in the British press has been positive:

The author Peter Conrad praised Gelb's showmanship:

Production
 six Metropolitan Opera employees work full-time on Live in HD. About 40 people work on the technical aspects of each broadcast, with one comparing the scale of the logistics to the preshow coverage of the Emmy or Academy Awards. Host Renée Fleming volunteers her services. No same-day substitution of a major cast member for a Live in HD performance was necessary until January 2010, perhaps because of the appeal of performing for a worldwide audience and the opportunity to appear on the subsequent DVD of the broadcast.

Audience
Movie and radio broadcast revenue increased for the Met from about $5 million in 2006, Live in HD's first year, to $22 million in 2008, with Live in HD contributing the bulk of the growth. For the 2009/10 season, the Met spent about $12 million in production and received about half of the $47 million box-office gross. After paying royalties to its cast and crew, the Met earned a $8 million profit. The Met's Live in HD revenue for the 2012/13 season was $34.5 million.

According to a 2008 study commissioned by Opera America, most Live in HD attendees were "moderate and frequent opera goers". About one in five, however, did not attend a live opera performance in the previous two years, with some being completely new to opera and attending because of curiosity about it. The majority claimed to equally enjoy broadcast and live opera, and more than half stated they would "very likely" attend an opera performance at the Met if visiting New York. A 2011 University of British Columbia thesis found that "Live in HD does not at present cannibalize the local live opera audience ... [but] There is no evidence that [it] generates more live opera attendance or brings new audiences into local opera houses".

A report outlines the economics of the Met's 2013–2014 season:
Last season, 10 operas were transmitted via satellite into at least 2,000 theaters in 66 countries, including more than 800 U.S. theaters. Box office hit $60 million worldwide (average ticket prices were $23 last season), with theater owners splitting sales 50–50 with the Met (insiders say the split is more advantageous to the Met in North America) and Fathom taking a small percentage as well.

Vladica and Davis have utilised Q methodology to analyse audience reactions and judgments of entertainment value with respect to this series, and related cultural events transmitted to cinemas.

Seasons

2006–2007
Beginning on December 30, 2006, as part of the company's effort to build revenues and attract new audiences, the Met broadcast a series of six performances live via satellite into movie theaters. The series was carried in over 100 movie theaters across North America plus others in Britain, Japan and one in Norway. It included:
 Julie Taymor's production of Mozart's The Magic Flute, on December 30, 2006, in an abridged English version conducted by James Levine and starring Ying Huang as Pamina, Matthew Polenzani as Tamino, and Nathan Gunn as Papageno.
 Bellini's I puritani, on January 6, 2007, starring Anna Netrebko, Eric Cutler and Franco Vassallo in the roles of Elvira, Arturo and Riccardo, in the 1976 Sandro Sequi production conducted by Patrick Summers.
 The world premiere of Tan Dun's The First Emperor, on January 13, 2007, with Plácido Domingo in the title role of Emperor Qin in a production by Zhan Yimou and conducted by Dun himself.
 Tchaikovsky's Eugene Onegin, on February 24, 2007, starring Dmitri Hvorostovsky, Renée Fleming and Ramón Vargas in the roles of Onegin, Tatiana and Lensky in Robert Carsen's simple but beautiful production conducted by Valery Gergiev.
 Rossini's The Barber of Seville, on March 24, 2007, in the new hit production by Bartlett Sher, with Peter Mattei, Joyce DiDonato and Juan Diego Flórez as Figaro, Rosina and Almaviva, and conducted by Maurizio Benini.
 Puccini's Il trittico, on April 28, 2007, in another new hit production, this time by Jack O'Brien and conducted by James Levine. Maria Guleghina, Salvatore Licitra and Juan Pons, in the roles of Giorgetta, Luigi and Michele, sang in Il tabarro, Barbara Frittoli starred in the title role of Suor Angelica, and Gianni Schicchi was played by Alessandro Corbelli with Olga Mykytenko and Massimo Giordano in the roles of Lauretta and Rinuccio. Stephanie Blythe starred in all three operas, singing the roles of Frugola, the Princess and Zita.

In addition, limited repeat showings of the operas were offered in most of the presenting cities. Within the US, digital sound for the performances was provided by Sirius Satellite Radio.

These movie transmissions were successful at the box office as well as having received wide and generally favorable press coverage. The Met reports that 91% of available seats were sold for the HD performances. According to General Manager Peter Gelb, there were 60,000 people in cinemas around the world watching the March 24 transmission of The Barber of Seville. The New York Times reported that 324,000 tickets were sold worldwide for the 2006–07 season, while each simulcast cost $850,000 to $1 million to produce.

If one counts Il trittico as a single work, this is the only Met Live in HD season in which every work broadcast is by a different composer. The Met nearly accomplished this during the 2014-15 season, but swapped Il barbiere di Siviglia in for The Death of Klinghoffer, thus causing a double-up of Rossini operas (as La donna del lago was already scheduled).

2007–2008
Due to the success of the first season, the Metropolitan Opera decided to increase the number of HD broadcasts to movie theaters from six to eight during the 2007–2008 season. Further, the number of available theaters expanded to 330 across the US and additional countries throughout the world.

The first showing on December 15, 2007, Gounod's Roméo et Juliette, was seen on 477 screens and sold an estimated 97,000 tickets. The series continued by featuring seven more of the Met's productions following Roméo et Juliette and ending with La fille du régiment on April 26, 2008.

The Met planned to broadcast to double the number of theaters in the US compared with the previous season, as well as to additional countries. The number of participating venues in the US, which includes movie theatre chains as well as independent theatres and some college campus venues, was 343. While "the scope of the series expands to include more than 700 locations across North America, Europe, Asia, and Australia.... The Met has said that it hopes to reach as many as one million audience members with this season's HD transmissions"

The schedule of live broadcasts included:

 Gounod's Roméo et Juliette (Anna Netrebko, Roberto Alagna, Nathan Gunn, conducted by Plácido Domingo), broadcast on December 15, 2007
 Humperdinck's Hansel and Gretel (Christine Schäfer, Alice Coote, Philip Langridge, conducted by Vladimir Jurowski), broadcast on January 1, 2008
 Verdi's Macbeth (Željko Lučić, Maria Guleghina, John Relyea, conducted by James Levine), broadcast on January 12, 2008
 Puccini's Manon Lescaut (Karita Mattila, Marcello Giordani, Dwayne Croft, conducted by James Levine), broadcast on February 16, 2008
 Britten's Peter Grimes (Anthony Dean Griffey, Patricia Racette, Felicity Palmer, conducted by Donald Runnicles), broadcast on March 15, 2008
 Wagner's Tristan und Isolde (Deborah Voigt, Robert Dean Smith, Matti Salminen, conducted by James Levine), broadcast on March 22, 2008
 Puccini's La bohème (Ramón Vargas, Angela Gheorghiu, Ludovic Tézier, Ainhoa Arteta, conducted by Nicola Luisotti), broadcast on April 5, 2008
 Donizetti's La fille du régiment (Natalie Dessay, Juan Diego Flórez, Alessandro Corbelli, conducted by Marco Armiliato), broadcast on April 26, 2008

By the end of the season, 920,000 people—exceeding the total number of people who attended live performances at the Met over the entire season—attended the 8 screenings bringing in a gross of $13.3 million from North America and $5 million from overseas.

2008–2009
The HD season for 2008–2009 included 11 productions, including the Opening Night Gala on September 22, 2008, (broadcast in North America only).

 Opening Night Gala (Excerpts from La traviata, Manon and Capriccio, starring Renée Fleming), broadcast on September 22, 2008
 Richard Strauss' Salome (Karita Mattila, Kim Begley, Juha Uusitalo, conducted by Patrick Summers), broadcast on October 11, 2008
 John Adams' Doctor Atomic (Gerald Finley, Eric Owens, Sasha Cooke, conducted by Alan Gilbert), broadcast on November 8, 2008
 Berlioz's La damnation de Faust (Marcello Giordani, Susan Graham, John Relyea, conducted by James Levine), broadcast on November 22, 2008
 Massenet's Thaïs (Renée Fleming, Thomas Hampson, Michael Schade, conducted by Jesús López Cobos), broadcast on December 20, 2008
 Puccini's La rondine (Angela Gheorghiu, Roberto Alagna, Samuel Ramey, Lisette Oropesa, Marius Brenciu, conducted by Marco Armiliato), broadcast on January 10, 2009
 Gluck's Orfeo ed Euridice (Stephanie Blythe, Danielle de Niese, Heidi Grant Murphy, conducted by James Levine, broadcast on January 24, 2009
 Donizetti's Lucia di Lammermoor (Anna Netrebko, Piotr Beczała, Mariusz Kwiecień, conducted by Marco Armiliato), broadcast on February 7, 2009
 Puccini's Madama Butterfly (Patricia Racette, Marcello Giordani, Dwayne Croft, conducted by Patrick Summers), broadcast on March 7, 2009
 Bellini's La sonnambula (Natalie Dessay, Juan Diego Flórez, Michele Pertusi, conducted by Evelino Pidò), broadcast on March 21, 2009
 Rossini's La Cenerentola (Elīna Garanča, Lawrence Brownlee, Alessandro Corbelli, conducted by Maurizio Benini), broadcast on May 9, 2009

As of February 2009, over 1.1 million tickets to HD broadcasts had been sold.

2009–2010

 Puccini's Tosca (Karita Mattila, Marcelo Álvarez, George Gagnidze, conducted by Joseph Colaneri), broadcast on October 10, 2009
 Verdi's Aida (Violeta Urmana, Dolora Zajick, Johan Botha, conducted by Daniele Gatti), broadcast on October 24, 2009
 Puccini's Turandot (Maria Guleghina, Marcello Giordani, Marina Poplavskaya, Samuel Ramey, conducted by Andris Nelsons), broadcast on November 7, 2009
 Offenbach's Les Contes d'Hoffmann (Joseph Calleja, Anna Netrebko, Kate Lindsey, Alan Held, conducted by James Levine), broadcast on December 19, 2009
 Richard Strauss' Der Rosenkavalier (Renée Fleming, Susan Graham, Kristinn Sigmundsson, Christine Schäfer, conducted by Edo de Waart), broadcast on January 9, 2010
 Bizet's Carmen (Elīna Garanča, Roberto Alagna, Barbara Frittoli, Teddy Tahu Rhodes, conducted by Yannick Nézet-Séguin), broadcast on January 16, 2010
 Simon Boccanegra (Plácido Domingo, James Morris, Adrianne Pieczonka, Marcello Giordani, conducted by James Levine), broadcast on February 6, 2010
 Thomas' Hamlet (Simon Keenlyside, James Morris, Marlis Petersen, conducted by Louis Langrée), broadcast on March 27, 2010
 Rossini's Armida (Renée Fleming, Lawrence Brownlee, John Osborn, conducted by Riccardo Frizza), broadcast on May 1, 2010

2010–2011

Lucia di Lammermoor became the first opera to receive a repeat HD broadcast, having previously been HD'd during the 2008-09 season.
 Wagner's Das Rheingold (Bryn Terfel, Eric Owens, Stephanie Blythe, Richard Croft, conducted by James Levine), broadcast on October 9, 2010
 Mussorgsky's Boris Godunov (René Pape, Aleksandrs Antonenko, Ekaterina Semenchuk, conducted by Valery Gergiev), broadcast on October 23, 2010
 Donizetti's Don Pasquale (Anna Netrebko, John Del Carlo, Mariusz Kwiecień, Matthew Polenzani, conducted by James Levine), broadcast on November 13, 2010
 Verdi's Don Carlo (Roberto Alagna, Ferruccio Furlanetto, Marina Poplavskaya, Simon Keenlyside, conducted by Yannick Nézet-Séguin), broadcast on December 11, 2010
 Puccini's La fanciulla del West (Deborah Voigt, Marcello Giordani, Lucio Gallo, conducted by Nicola Luisotti), broadcast on January 8, 2011
 John Adams' Nixon in China (James Maddalena, Janis Kelly, Kathleen Kim, conducted by John Adams), broadcast on February 12, 2011
 Gluck's Iphigénie en Tauride (Susan Graham, Plácido Domingo, Paul Groves, conducted by Patrick Summers), broadcast on February 26, 2011
 Donizetti's Lucia di Lammermoor (Natalie Dessay, Joseph Calleja, Ludovic Tézier, conducted by Patrick Summers), broadcast on March 19, 2011
 Rossini's Le comte Ory (Juan Diego Flórez, Joyce DiDonato, Diana Damrau, conducted by Maurizio Benini), broadcast on April 9, 2011
 Richard Strauss' Capriccio (Renée Fleming, Joseph Kaiser, Russell Braun, conducted by Andrew Davis), broadcast on April 23, 2011
 Verdi's Il trovatore (Sondra Radvanovsky, Dmitri Hvorostovsky, Marcelo Álvarez, Dolora Zajick conducted by Marco Armiliato), broadcast on April 30, 2011
 Wagner's Die Walküre (Deborah Voigt, Jonas Kaufmann, Eva-Maria Westbroek, Bryn Terfel, conducted by James Levine), broadcast on May 14, 2011

2011–2012

 Donizetti's Anna Bolena (Anna Netrebko, Ekaterina Gubanova, Ildar Abdrazakov, conducted by Marco Armiliato), broadcast on October 15, 2011
 Mozart's Don Giovanni (Mariusz Kwiecień, Marina Rebeka, Luca Pisaroni, Barbara Frittoli, conducted by Fabio Luisi), broadcast on October 29, 2011
 Wagner's Siegfried (Jay Hunter Morris, Bryn Terfel, Deborah Voigt, conducted by Fabio Luisi), broadcast on November 5, 2011
 Glass' Satyagraha (Richard Croft, Maria Zifchak, Rachelle Durkin, conducted by Dante Anzolini), broadcast on November 19, 2011
 Handel's Rodelinda (Renée Fleming, Andreas Scholl, Stephanie Blythe, conducted by Harry Bicket), broadcast on December 3, 2011
 Gounod's Faust (Jonas Kaufmann, René Pape, Marina Poplavskaya, conducted by Yannick Nézet-Séguin), broadcast on December 10, 2011
 Baroque pasticheThe Enchanted Island (David Daniels, Joyce DiDonato, Danielle de Niese, Plácido Domingo, Lisette Oropesa, Anthony Roth Costanzo, conducted by William Christie), broadcast on January 21, 2012
 Wagner's Götterdämmerung (Deborah Voigt, Jay Hunter Morris, Waltraud Meier, conducted by Fabio Luisi), broadcast on February 11, 2012
 Verdi's Ernani (Angela Meade, Marcello Giordani, Dmitri Hvorostovsky, Ferruccio Furlanetto, conducted by Marco Armiliato), broadcast on February 25, 2012
 Massenet's Manon (Anna Netrebko, Piotr Beczała, Paulo Szot, conducted by Fabio Luisi), broadcast on April 7, 2012
 Verdi's La traviata (Natalie Dessay, Matthew Polenzani, Dmitri Hvorostovsky, conducted by Fabio Luisi), broadcast on April 14, 2012

2012–2013

 Donizetti's L'elisir d'amore (Anna Netrebko, Matthew Polenzani, Mariusz Kwiecień, Ambrogio Maestri, conducted by Maurizio Benini), broadcast on October 13, 2012
 Verdi's Otello (Johan Botha, Renée Fleming, Falk Struckmann, conducted by Semyon Bychkov), broadcast on October 27, 2012
 Adès' The Tempest (Simon Keenlyside, Isabel Leonard, Audrey Luna, conducted by Thomas Adès), broadcast on November 10, 2012
 Mozart's La clemenza di Tito (Elīna Garanča, Barbara Frittoli, Giuseppe Filianoti, conducted by Harry Bicket), broadcast on December 1, 2012
 Verdi's Un ballo in maschera (Marcelo Álvarez, Sondra Radvanovsky, Dmitri Hvorostovsky, Kathleen Kim, Stephanie Blythe, conducted by Fabio Luisi), broadcast on December 8, 2012
 Verdi's Aida (Liudmyla Monastyrska, Roberto Alagna, Olga Borodina, conducted by Fabio Luisi), broadcast on December 15, 2012
 Berlioz's Les Troyens (Bryan Hymel, Susan Graham, Deborah Voigt, conducted by Fabio Luisi), broadcast on January 5, 2013
 Donizetti's Maria Stuarda (Joyce DiDonato, Elza van den Heever, Matthew Polenzani, conducted by Maurizio Benini, broadcast on January 19, 2013
 Verdi's Rigoletto (Željko Lučić, Diana Damrau, Piotr Beczała, conducted by Michele Mariotti), broadcast on February 16, 2013
 Wagner's Parsifal (Jonas Kaufmann, René Pape, Peter Mattei, Katarina Dalayman, conducted by Daniele Gatti), broadcast on March 2, 2013
 Zandonai's Francesca da Rimini (Eva-Maria Westbroek, Marcello Giordani, Mark Delavan, conducted by Marco Armiliato), broadcast on March 16, 2013
 Handel's Giulio Cesare (Natalie Dessay, David Daniels, Alice Coote, conducted by Harry Bicket), broadcast on April 27, 2013

2013–2014

The 2013-14 season was the first season where the Met capped the series at 10 broadcasts per season, a rule which has held ever since.

 Tchaikovsky's Eugene Onegin (Anna Netrebko, Mariusz Kwiecień, Piotr Beczała, conducted by Valery Gergiev), broadcast on October 5, 2013
 Shostakovich's The Nose (Paulo Szot, Andrey Popov, Alexander Lewis, conducted by Pavel Smelkov), broadcast on October 26, 2013
 Puccini's Tosca (Patricia Racette, Roberto Alagna, George Gagnidze, conducted by Riccardo Frizza), broadcast on November 9, 2013
 Verdi's Falstaff (Ambrogio Maestri, Angela Meade, Stephanie Blythe conducted by James Levine), broadcast on December 14, 2013
 Dvorák's Rusalka (Renée Fleming, Dolora Zajick, Piotr Beczała, conducted by Yannick Nézet-Séguin), broadcast on February 8, 2014
 Borodin's Prince Igor (Ildar Abdrazakov, Oksana Dyka, Anita Rachvelishvili, conducted by Gianandrea Noseda), broadcast on March 1, 2014
 Massenet's Werther (Jonas Kaufmann, Sophie Koch, David Bižić, Lisette Oropesa, conducted by Alain Altinoglu), broadcast on March 15, 2014
 Puccini's La bohème (Kristīne Opolais, Vittorio Grigolo, Susanna Phillips, conducted by Stefano Ranzani), broadcast on April 5, 2014
 Mozart's Così fan tutte (Susanna Phillips, Danielle de Niese, Matthew Polenzani, Isabel Leonard, Rodion Pogossov, Maurizio Muraro, conducted by James Levine), broadcast on April 26, 2014
 Rossini's La Cenerentola (Joyce DiDonato, Juan Diego Flórez, Luca Pisaroni, conducted by Fabio Luisi), broadcast on May 10, 2014

2014–2015
The 2014–2015 season presented 12 operas in 10 HD transmissions, including (for the first time in the series) two "double-bills" where two short operas were staged together on the same program. John Adams's The Death of Klinghoffer was originally planned for an HD transmission but was replaced by Il barbiere di Siviglia due to controversy after the work was accused of being anti-Semitic. The 2014-15 season is the most recent season in which more of the operas being broadcast were first-time Live in HD broadcasts (8 operas in 6 broadcasts) than repeat broadcasts (4 operas in as many broadcasts); all seasons since then have either had equal numbers or more operas getting repeat broadcasts.

 Macbeth (Željko Lučić, Anna Netrebko, Joseph Calleja, René Pape, conducted by Fabio Luisi), broadcast on October 11, 2014
 Le nozze di Figaro (Ildar Abdrazakov, Marlis Petersen, Peter Mattei, conducted by James Levine), broadcast on October 18, 2014
 Carmen (Anita Rachvelishvili, Aleksandrs Antonenko, Anita Hartig, Ildar Abdrazakov,  conducted by Pablo Heras-Casado), broadcast on November 1, 2014
 Il barbiere di Siviglia (Isabel Leonard, Lawrence Brownlee, Christopher Maltman,  conducted by Michele Mariotti), broadcast on November 22, 2014
 Die Meistersinger von Nürnberg (Michael Volle, Johan Botha, Annette Dasch, conducted by James Levine), broadcast on December 13, 2014
 The Merry Widow  (Renée Fleming, Nathan Gunn, Kelli O'Hara, Thomas Allen conducted by Andrew Davis), broadcast on January 17, 2015
 Les contes d'Hoffmann (Vittorio Grigolo, Hibla Gerzmava, Thomas Hampson, Kate Lindsey  conducted by Yves Abel), broadcast on January 31, 2015
 Iolanta and Duke Bluebeard's Castle (Anna Netrebko, Piotr Beczała, Nadja Michael, Mikhail Petrenko,  conducted by Valery Gergiev), broadcast on February 14, 2015
 La donna del lago (Joyce DiDonato, Juan Diego Flórez, Daniela Barcellona,  conducted by Michele Mariotti), broadcast on March 14, 2015
 Cavalleria rusticana and Pagliacci (Marcelo Álvarez, Eva-Maria Westbroek, Patricia Racette,  conducted by Fabio Luisi), broadcast on April 25, 2015

2015–2016

 Il trovatore (Anna Netrebko, Yonghoon Lee, Dmitri Hvorostovsky, Dolora Zajick,  conducted by Marco Armiliato), broadcast on October 3, 2015
 Otello (Aleksandrs Antoņenko, Sonya Yoncheva, Željko Lučić,  conducted by Yannick Nézet-Séguin), broadcast on October 17, 2015
 Tannhäuser (Johan Botha, Eva-Maria Westbroek, Peter Mattei, Michelle DeYoung,  conducted by James Levine), broadcast on October 31, 2015
 Lulu (Marlis Petersen, Susan Graham, Johan Reuter,  conducted by Lothar Koenigs), broadcast on November 21, 2015
 Les pêcheurs de perles (Matthew Polenzani, Diana Damrau, Mariusz Kwiecień,  conducted by Gianandrea Noseda), broadcast on January 16, 2016
 Turandot (Nina Stemme, Marco Berti, Anita Hartig,  conducted by Paolo Carignani), broadcast on January 30, 2016
 Manon Lescaut  (Kristīne Opolais, Roberto Alagna, Massimo Cavalletti,  conducted by Fabio Luisi), broadcast on March 5, 2016
 Madama Butterfly (Kristīne Opolais, Roberto Alagna, Dwayne Croft,  conducted by Karel Mark Chichon), broadcast on April 2, 2016
 Roberto Devereux (Sondra Radvanovsky, Matthew Polenzani, Elīna Garanča, Mariusz Kwiecień,  conducted by Maurizio Benini), broadcast on April 16, 2016
 Elektra  (Nina Stemme, Waltraud Meier, Adrianne Pieczonka, Eric Owens,  conducted by Esa-Pekka Salonen), broadcast on April 30, 2016

2016–2017
The 2016–2017 season included the presentation of the first opera by a female composer in the series, L'Amour de loin of Kaija Saariaho, which also marked the first opera in the series to feature a female conductor, Susanna Mälkki. The presentation of Der Rosenkavalier marked the final performances in their respective roles by Renée Fleming (the Marschallin) and Elīna Garanča (Octavian).

 Tristan und Isolde (Nina Stemme, Stuart Skelton, Ekaterina Gubanova, René Pape, conducted by Sir Simon Rattle), broadcast on October 8, 2016
 Don Giovanni (Simon Keenlyside, Hibla Gerzmava, Malin Byström, Paul Appleby, Adam Plachetka conducted by Fabio Luisi), broadcast on October 22, 2016
 L'Amour de loin (Eric Owens, Susanna Phillips, Tamara Mumford, conducted by Susanna Mälkki), broadcast on December 10, 2016
 Nabucco (Plácido Domingo, Liudmyla Monastyrska, Dimitry Belosselskiy, Jamie Barton, conducted by James Levine), broadcast on January 7, 2017
 Roméo et Juliette (Diana Damrau, Vittorio Grigolo, Mikhail Petrenko, Elliot Madore, Virginie Verrez, conducted by Gianndrea Noseda), broadcast on January 21, 2017
 Rusalka (Kristīne Opolais, Brandon Jovanovich, Jamie Barton, Eric Owens, Katarina Dalayman, conducted by Mark Elder), broadcast on February 25, 2017
 La traviata (Sonya Yoncheva, Michael Fabiano, Thomas Hampson, conducted by Nicola Luisotti), broadcast on March 11, 2017
 Idomeneo (Matthew Polenzani, Alice Coote, Elza van den Heever, Nadine Sierra, conducted by James Levine), broadcast on March 25, 2017
 Eugene Onegin (Anna Netrebko, Peter Mattei, Alexy Dolgov, Štefan Kocán, conducted by Robin Ticciati), broadcast on April 22, 2017
 Der Rosenkavalier (Renée Fleming, Elīna Garanča, Erin Morley, Günther Groissböck, conducted by Sebastian Weigle), broadcast on May 13, 2017

2017–2018

 Norma (Sondra Radvanovsky, Joyce DiDonato, Joseph Calleja, Matthew Rose, conducted by Carlo Rizzi), broadcast on October 7, 2017
 Die Zauberflöte (Golda Schultz, Kathryn Lewek, Charles Castronovo, Markus Werba, René Pape, conducted by James Levine), broadcast on October 14, 2017
 The Exterminating Angel (Sally Matthews, Alice Coote, Christine Rice, Iestyn Davies, Rod Gilfry, John Tomlinson, Amanda Echalaz, conducted by Thomas Adès), broadcast on November 18, 2017
 Tosca (Sonya Yoncheva, Vittorio Grigolo, Željko Lučić, conducted by Emmanuel Villaume), broadcast on January 27, 2018
 L'elisir d'amore (Pretty Yende, Matthew Polenzani, Ildebrando D'Arcangelo, Davide Luciano, conducted by Domingo Hindoyan), broadcast on February 10, 2018
 La bohème (Sonya Yoncheva, Susanna Phillips, Michael Fabiano, Lucas Meachem, conducted by Marco Armiliato), broadcast on February 24, 2018
 Semiramide (Angela Meade, Elizabeth DeShong, Javier Camarena, Ildar Abdrazakov, conducted by Maurizio Benini), broadcast on March 10, 2018
 Così fan tutte (Kelli O'Hara, Amanda Majeski, Serena Malfi, Ben Bliss, Adam Plachetka, Christopher Maltman, conducted by David Robertson), broadcast on March 31, 2018
 Luisa Miller (Sonya Yoncheva, Olesya Petrova, Piotr Beczała, Plácido Domingo, conducted by Bertrand de Billy), broadcast on April 14, 2018
 Cendrillon (Joyce DiDonato, Alice Coote, Stephanie Blythe, Kathleen Kim, conducted by Bertrand de Billy), broadcast on April 28, 2018

2018–2019

 Aida (Anna Netrebko, Anita Rachvelishvili, Aleksandrs Antoņenko, Quinn Kelsey, conducted by Nicola Luisotti), broadcast on October 6, 2018
 Samson et Dalila (Elīna Garanča, Roberto Alagna, Laurent Naouri, Dmitry Belosselskiy, conducted by Mark Elder), broadcast on October 20, 2018
 La fanciulla del West (Eva-Maria Westbroek, Jonas Kaufmann, Željko Lučić, Carlo Bosi, conducted by Marco Armiliato), broadcast on October 27, 2018
 Marnie (Isabel Leonard, Christopher Maltman, Denyce Graves, Iestyn Davies, Janis Kelly, conducted by Robert Spano), broadcast on November 10, 2018
 La traviata (Diana Damrau, Juan Diego Flórez, Quinn Kelsey, conducted by Yannick Nézet-Séguin), broadcast on December 15, 2018
 Adriana Lecouvreur (Anna Netrebko, Piotr Beczała, Anita Rachvelishvili, Ambrogio Maestri, conducted by Gianandrea Noseda), broadcast on January 12, 2019
 Carmen (Clémentine Margaine, Roberto Alagna, Aleksandra Kurzak, Alexander Vinogradov, conducted by Louis Langrée), broadcast on February 2, 2019
 La fille du régiment (Pretty Yende, Javier Camarena, Stephanie Blythe, Maurizio Muraro, Kathleen Turner, conducted by Enrique Mazzola), broadcast on March 2, 2019
 Die Walküre (Christine Goerke, Eva-Maria Westbroek, Stuart Skelton, Greer Grimsley, Jamie Barton, conducted by Philippe Jordan), broadcast on March 30, 2019
 Dialogues des Carmélites (Isabel Leonard, Adrianne Pieczonka, Karita Mattila, Karen Cargill, conducted by Yannick Nézet-Séguin), broadcast on May 11, 2019

2019–2020 (abbreviated)

The final three performances were cancelled due to the COVID-19 pandemic.
 Turandot (Christine Goerke, Yusif Eyvazov, Eleonora Buratto, James Morris, conducted by Yannick Nézet-Séguin) broadcast on October 12, 2019
 Manon (Lisette Oropesa, Michael Fabiano, Artur Ruciński, Carlo Bosi, conducted by Maurizio Benini), broadcast on October 26, 2019
 Madama Butterfly (Hui He, Elizabeth DeShong, Bruce Sledge, Paulo Szot, conducted by Pier Giorgio Morandi), broadcast on November 9, 2019
 Akhnaten (Anthony Roth Costanzo, J'Nai Bridges, Dísella Lárusdóttir, Aaron Blake, Zachary James, conducted by Karen Kamensek), broadcast on November 23, 2019
 Wozzeck (Peter Mattei, Elza van den Heever, Gerhard Siegel, Christian Van Horn, conducted by Yannick Nézet-Séguin), broadcast on January 11, 2020
 Porgy and Bess (Eric Owens, Angel Blue, Denyce Graves, Latonia Moore, Frederick Ballentine, Alfred Walker, Golda Schultz, conducted by David Robertson), broadcast on February 1, 2020
 Agrippina (Joyce DiDonato, Brenda Rae, Kate Lindsey, Iestyn Davies, Matthew Rose, conducted by Harry Bicket), broadcast on February 29, 2020,

The following broadcasts were scheduled, but cancelled due to the COVID-19 pandemic:
 Der fliegende Holländer (Evgeny Nikitin, Anja Kampe, Sergey Skorokhodov, Franz-Josef Selig, conducted by Valery Gergiev). Originally scheduled for March 14, 2020, the Live-in-HD performance was cancelled, but a video recording prepared from rehearsal tapes of earlier performances was telecast on July 5, 2020, as part of the PBS Great Performances series and is available for streaming at Met Opera on Demand.
 Tosca (Anna Netrebko, Brian Jagde, Michael Volle, conducted by Bertrand de Billy), originally scheduled for April 11, 2020
 Maria Stuarda (Diana Damrau, Jamie Barton, Stephen Costello, Michele Pertusi, conducted by Maurizio Benini), originally scheduled for May 9, 2020

2020–2021 (cancelled)

Due to the COVID-19 pandemic the Met was forced to cancel its entire 2020–2021 season. The following performances were scheduled to be broadcast:
 Aida (Anna Netrebko, Piotr Beczała, Anita Rachvelishvili, Ludovic Tézier, conducted by Yannick Nézet-Séguin)
 Il Trovatore (Sonya Yoncheva, Ekaterina Semenchuk, Roberto Aronica, Quinn Kelsey, conducted by Michele Mariotti)
 Fidelio (Lise Davidsen, Brandon Jovanovich, Franz-Josef Selig, Tomasz Konieczny, Golda Schultz, conducted by Yannick Nézet-Séguin)
 Die Zauberflöte (Christiane Karg, Stanislas de Barbeyrac, Thomas Oliemans, Kathryn Lewek, Stephan Milling, conducted by Gustavo Dudamel)
 Roméo et Juliette (Nadine Sierra, Stephen Costello, Joshua Hopkins, Julie Boulianne, Ildar Abdrazakov, conducted by Yannick Nézet-Séguin)
 Don Giovanni (Peter Mattei, Gerald Finley, Ailyn Pérez, Isabel Leonard, Ben Bliss, conducted by Yannick Nézet-Séguin)
 Dead Man Walking (Joyce DiDonato, Etienne Dupuis, Susan Graham, Latonia Moore, conducted by Yannick Nézet-Séguin)
 Die Frau ohne Schatten (Elza van den Heever, Nina Stemme, Evelyn Herlitzius, Klaus Florian Vogt, Michael Volle, conducted by Yannick Nézet-Séguin)
 Nabucco (George Gagnidze, Anna Netrebko, Dmitry Belosselskiy, Varduhi Abrahamyan, Najmiddin Mavlyanov, conducted by Marco Armiliato)
 Il Pirata (Diana Damrau, Javier Camarena, Nicolas Testé, conducted by Maurizio Benini)

2021–2022

 Boris Godunov (René Pape, David Butt Philip, Ain Anger, Maxim Paster, Aleksey Bogdanov, conducted by Sebastian Weigle), broadcast on October 9, 2021
 Fire Shut Up in My Bones (Will Liverman, Angel Blue, Latonia Moore, Ryan Speedo Green, conducted by Yannick Nézet-Séguin), broadcast on October 23, 2021
 Eurydice (Erin Morley, Joshua Hopkins, Jakub Józef Orliński, Barry Banks, Nathan Berg, conducted by Yannick Nézet-Séguin), broadcast on December 4, 2021
 Cinderella (Isabel Leonard, Stephanie Blythe, Emily D'Angelo, Jessica Pratt, Laurent Naouri, conducted by Emmanuel Villaume), broadcast on January 1, 2022
 Rigoletto (Quinn Kelsey, Piotr Beczala, Rosa Feola, Andrea Mastroni, Varduhi Abrahamyan, conducted by Daniele Rustioni), broadcast on January 29, 2022
 Ariadne auf Naxos (Lise Davidsen, Brenda Rae, Isabel Leonard, Brandon Jovanovich, Johannes Martin Kränzle, Sean Michael Plumb, Wolfgang Brendel, conducted by Marek Janowski), broadcast on March 12, 2022
 Don Carlos (Matthew Polenzani, Sonya Yoncheva, Jamie Barton, Etienne Dupuis, Eric Owens, John Relyea, conducted by Patrick Furrer), broadcast on March 26, 2022
 Turandot (Liudmyla Monastyrska, Yonghoon Lee, Ermonela Jaho, Ferruccio Furlanetto conducted by Marco Armiliato), broadcast on May 7, 2022
 Lucia di Lammermoor (Nadine Sierra, Javier Camarena, Artur Rucinski, Christian Van Horn, conducted by Riccardo Frizza), broadcast on May 21, 2022
 Hamlet (composed by Brett Dean) (Allan Clayton, Brenda Rae, Rod Gilfry, Sarah Connelly, Sir John Tomlinson, Willian Burden, Jacques Imbrailo, conducted by Nicholas Carter), broadcast on June 4, 2022

2022–2023

The season was originally scheduled to include a broadcast of Don Carlo in a four-act Italian version on November 19, 2022. It was removed from the schedule and replaced with Falstaff following the firing of Anna Netrebko from the Don Carlo revival. This is the second time that an HD broadcast has been replaced, after the replacement of The Death of Klinghoffer in 2014.
 Medea (Sondra Radvanovsky, Matthew Polenzani, Janai Brugger, Michele Pertusi, conducted by Carlo Rizzi), broadcast on October 22, 2022.
 La Traviata (Nadine Sierra, Stephen Costello, Luca Salsi, conducted by Daniele Callegari) broadcast on November 5, 2022
 The Hours (Renée Fleming, Kelli O'Hara, Joyce DiDonato, Denyce Graves, William Burden, conducted by Yannick Nézet-Séguin) broadcast on December 10, 2022
 Fedora  (Sonya Yoncheva, Piotr Beczala, Rosa Feola, Artur Rucinski, conducted by Marco Armiliato, to be broadcast January 14, 2023
 Lohengrin (Piotr Beczala, Tamara Wilson, Christine Goerke, Evgeny Nikitin, Günther Groissböck, Brian Mulligan, conducted by Yannick Nézet-Séguin), to be broadcast March 18, 2023
 Falstaff (Michael Volle, Ailyn Pérez, Christopher Maltman, Hera Hyesang Park, Marie-Nicole Lemieux, Bogdan Volkov, Jennifer Johnson Cano, conducted by Daniele Rustioni) to be broadcast on April 1, 2023
 Der Rosenkavalier (Lise Davidsen, Isabel Leonard, Erin Morley, Günther Groissböck, conducted by Simone Young)  to be broadcast April 15, 2023
 Champion (Eric Owens, Ryan Speedo Green, Latonia Moore, Stephanie Blythe) conducted by Yannick Nézet-Séguin)  to be broadcast April 29
 Don Giovanni (Peter Mattei, Adam Plachetka, Federica Lombardi, Ana María Martínez, Ying Fang, Ben Bliss, conducted by Nathalie Stutzmann)  to be broadcast May 20, 2023
 Die Zauberflöte (Lawrence Brownlee, Erin Morley, Kathryn Lewek, Thomas Oliemans, Stephen Milling, conducted by Nathalie Stutzmann), to be broadcast June 3, 2023

2023–2024

 Dead Man Walking (Joyce DiDonato, Susan Graham, Ryan McKinny, Latonia Moore, conducted by Yannick Nézet-Séguin) to be broadcast on October 21, 2023
 X, The Life and Times of Malcolm X (Will Liverman, Leah Hawkins, Raehann Bryce-Davis, Victor Ryan Robertson, Michael Sumuel, conducted by Kazem Abdullah) to be broadcast November 18, 2023
 Florencia en el Amazonas (Ailyn Pérez, Mattia Olivieri, Gabriella Reyes, Mario Chang, Nancy Fabiola Herrera, Michael Chioldi, Greer Grimsley, conducted by Yannick Nézet-Séguin) to be broadcast December 9, 2023
 Nabucco (Liudmyla Monastyrska, George Gagnidze, SeokJong Baek, Dmitry Belosselskiy, Maria Barakova, conducted by Daniele Callegari) to be broadcast January 6, 2024
 Carmen (Aigul Akhmetshina, Piotr Beczala, Angel Blue, Kyle Ketelsen, conducted by Daniele Rustioni to be broadcast January 27, 2024
 La Forza del Destino (Lise Davidsen, Brian Jagde, Igor Golovatenko, Soloman Howard, Ekaterina Semenchuk, conducted by Yannick Nézet-Séguin) to be broadcast March 9, 2024
 Romeo et Juliette (Nadine Sierra, Benjamin Bernheim, Will Liverman, Samantha Hankey, Alfred Walker, Frederick Ballentine, conducted by Yannick Nézet-Séguin) to be broadcast March 23, 2024)
 La Rondine (Angel Blue, Jonathan Tetelman, Emily Pogorelc, Bekhzod Davronov, conducted by Speranza Scappucci) to be broadcast April 20, 2024
 Madama Butterfly (Asmik Grigorian, Jonathan Tetelman, Lucas Meachem, Elizabeth DeShong, conducted by Xian Zhang) to be broadcast May 11, 2024

References

External links
 Live in HD, Metropolitan Opera
 Met Opera on Demand
 

Metropolitan Opera
Opera-related lists